Charlene du Preez (née Roux; born 4 December 1987) is a professional road and track cyclist from South Africa.

Career
Initially a road cyclist, du Preez was introduced to track racing in 2015. In 2018 she competed at the Commonwealth Games. In the Individual pursuit she finished 18th, and with the South African team in sixth place in the team pursuit.

In Pietermaritzburg in 2019 she became the African 500 meters champion, the African keirin champion and the African Individual Sprint Champion. In Cairo in 2020 she successfully defended all three of her titles and added the Team Sprint gold with Claudia Gnudi. She won all three individual titles again in 2021 for the third consecutive year. She holds 6 African track records.

She competed in both the women's sprint and the women's keirin at the 2020 Summer Olympics.

Major results

2015
 KZN Autumn Series
6th Freedom Day Classic
6th Hibiscus Cycle Classic
2016
 9th 94.7 Cycle Challenge
2017
 3rd  Road race, African Road Championships
2019
 African Track Championships
1st  500m time trial
1st  Keirin
1st  Sprint
2020
 African Track Championships
1st  500m time trial
1st  Keirin
1st  Sprint
1st  Team sprint
2021
 African Track Championships
1st  500m time trial
1st  Keirin
1st  Sprint

References

External links

1987 births
Living people
South African track cyclists
Commonwealth Games competitors for South Africa
Cyclists at the 2018 Commonwealth Games
People from Sasolburg
Cyclists at the 2020 Summer Olympics
Olympic cyclists of South Africa